The 2015 NCAA Division I baseball season, play of college baseball in the United States organized by the National Collegiate Athletic Association (NCAA) at the Division I level, began in February 2015.  The season progressed through the regular season, many conference tournaments and championship series, and concluded with the 2015 NCAA Division I baseball tournament and 2015 College World Series.  The College World Series, consisting of the eight remaining teams in the NCAA tournament and held annually in Omaha, Nebraska, at TD Ameritrade Park Omaha, ended on June 24, 2015, with the final game of the best-of-three championship series between Vanderbilt and Virginia, won by Virginia.

Realignment

There were many significant conference changes that took effect prior to the season.

 Maryland left the ACC for the Big Ten.
 Louisville and Rutgers left The American, joining the ACC and Big Ten respectively.
 A third team from The American, Temple, dropped baseball.
 East Carolina and Tulane left Conference USA for The American.
 Western Kentucky left the Sun Belt for Conference USA.
 Appalachian State, Davidson, Georgia Southern, and Elon all left the Southern Conference (SoCon). Appalachian State and Georgia Southern joined the Sun Belt, Davidson the Atlantic 10, and Elon the CAA.
 East Tennessee State and Mercer left the Atlantic Sun for the SoCon. ETSU returned to the SoCon after a nine-year absence.
 VMI left the Big South and returned to the SoCon after an 11-year absence.
 Oral Roberts returned to The Summit League after two seasons in the Southland.

In addition, the 2015 season was the last for Northern Kentucky in the Atlantic Sun and for NJIT as an independent. In July 2015, Northern Kentucky joined the Horizon League, and the Atlantic Sun replaced the Norse with NJIT. It was also the last for Texas–Pan American (UTPA) as an institution. UTPA merged with the University of Texas at Brownsville in July 2015 to form the new University of Texas Rio Grande Valley (UTRGV). The UTPA athletic program was inherited by UTRGV, with the nickname of Vaqueros, and UTRGV maintains UTPA's membership in the Western Athletic Conference.

Format changes
The Big South Conference dropped its divisional format.

New stadiums
 West Virginia opened the new Monongalia County Ballpark, with a fixed capacity of 2,500 plus extra hillside seating. The venue replaced Hawley Field, which closed for conference games after the 2012 season because it did not meet standards of the Big 12 Conference, which WVU joined in 2012. The Mountaineers played their 2013 and 2014 home conference games at several venues around the state, while Hawley Field remained in use for non-conference games. Once the college baseball season is over, the ballpark will be used by the West Virginia Black Bears, a Class A Short Season affiliate of the Pittsburgh Pirates.

Season outlook
For the full rankings, see 2015 NCAA Division I baseball rankings

Conference standings

Conference winners and tournaments
Twenty-nine athletic conferences each end their regular seasons with a single-elimination tournament or a double-elimination tournament. The teams in each conference that win their regular season title are given the number one seed in each tournament. The winners of these tournaments receive automatic invitations to the 2015 NCAA Division I baseball tournament.

College World Series

The 2015 College World Series will begin on June 13 in Omaha, Nebraska.

Coaching changes
This table lists programs that changed head coaches at any point from the first day of the 2015 season until the day before the first day of the 2016 season.

See also

2015 College Baseball All-America Team
2015 NCAA Division I baseball rankings
2015 NCAA Division I baseball tournament

References